The .17 Mach IV is a wildcat centerfire rifle cartridge, based on the .221 Remington Fireball case, necked down to fire a  bullet. The cartridge was introduced in 1962 by Vern O’Brien. The cartridge offered an easy case conversion and good ballistics, but could not compete against the .17 Remington.

The name, Mach IV, comes from the claim that the bullets can reach . Due to the relatively small case capacity, even small variations in powder of  can lead to the difference between a safe and dangerously over pressure load.

The .17 Mach IV became very popular with varmint hunters, so much so that in 2007, Remington introduced its own very similar version, the .17 Remington Fireball.

See also

.17 Remington Fireball
.221 Remington Fireball
4 mm caliber
List of rifle cartridges

References

Pistol and rifle cartridges
Wildcat cartridges